Phycella is a genus of herbaceous, perennial bulbous flowering plants belonging to the family Amaryllidaceae, subfamily Amaryllidoideae.  The genus consists of five species distributed from central Chile to northwestern Argentina.

Taxonomy 

The genus was described by John Lindley in 1825. After further examining specimens of Amaryllis ignea (see illustration) that he had described the previous year as Amaryllis, with some reservation, Lindley concluded they were a separate genus, naming two species, P. ignea, and P. cyrtanthoides (previously A. cyrtanthoides). Subsequently, it was considered these were the same plant, and P. ignea was reassigned to a synonym for P. cyrtanthoides.

Phylogeny 

Phycella is located in the American (Hippeastroid) clade of the Amaryllidoideaetribe, where it is placed in tribe Hippeastreae, subtribe Traubiinae. In molecular phylogenetic analysis, Phycella forms a sister group to the remainder of the Hippeastreae. In 1996 the Müller-Doblies' had situated it in subtribe Hippeastrinae based on morphological criteria, by submerging it in Hippeastrum. A detailed study of in-depth relations within Hippeastreae revealed a more complicated situation wit regard to the Chilean-Argentinian taxa which had not been well represented in earlier studies. There was strong support for two major clades, representing two subtribes, with Phycella and three other genera (but not Hippeastrum) forming the Traubiinae. This study also showed that one species of Famatina (F. maulensis) segregated with Phycella, and was therefore submerged in it as Phycella herbertiana. By contrast the remaining three Famatina species segregated with Rhodophiala and were therefore grouped in Hippeastrinae together with Hippeastrum. Consequently, Famatina has been extinguished as separate genus. The genus Placea was also submerged in Phycella, resulting in about 13 species in total.

Subdivision  

13–14 species are described:
 Phycella amoena Nic.García syn. Placea amoena
 Phycella arzae (Phil.) Nic.García syn. Placea arzae
 Phycella australis Ravenna 
 Phycella brevituba Herb. 
 Phycella chilensis (L’Hér.) Grau ex Nic.García syn. Amaryllis chilensis L’Hér.
 Phycella cyrtanthoides (Sims) Lindl. 
 Phycella davidii (Ravenna) Nic.García syn. Placea davidii
 Phycella fulgens (Hook.f.) Nic.García, syn. Habranthus fulgens Hook.f.
 Phycella germainii (Phil.) Nic.García syn. Placea germainii Phil.
 Phycella herbertiana Lindl.  syn. Famatina maulensis Ravenna 
 Phycella lutea (Phil.) Nic.García Placea lutea Phil.
 Phycella maulensis (Ravenna) Nic.García & J.M.Watson syn. Famatina maulensis Ravenna
 Phycella ornata (Miers) Nic.García syn. Placea ornata Miers
 Phycella scarlatina Ravenna

References

Bibliography 

 The International Plant Names Index Phycella.
 
 
 
 
 
 
 
 
 

 

Amaryllidoideae
Amaryllidaceae genera